Rocca di Villalago (Italian for Villalago Rocca)  is a  Middle Ages rocca in Villalago, Province of L'Aquila (Abruzzo).

References

External links

Rocca di Villalago
Villalago